Trampin' is the ninth studio album by Patti Smith, released April 27, 2004. It was the first album Smith released on the Columbia Records label. Rolling Stone magazine placed the record on its list of "The Top 50 Albums of 2004".

Track listing

Samples

Personnel 
Band
 Patti Smith – vocals, clarinet
 Lenny Kaye – guitar, pedal steel
 Jay Dee Daugherty – drums, percussion, guitar
 Oliver Ray – guitar, farfisa, art direction, design
 Tony Shanahan – bass, keyboards, hammond organ, back vocals

Additional personnel
 Gail Marowitz – art direction, design
 Greg Calbi – mastering
 Jesse Smith – piano
 Joe Hogan – assistant
 Melodie McDaniel – photography
 Patrick McCarthy – mixing
 Rebecca Weiner Tompkins – violin
 Tom Gloady – assistant
Emery Dobyns - Engineer

Charts

Release history

References

External links 
 
 Trampin' at Sony BMG
 Lyrics, notes and audio samples at official website

Patti Smith albums
2004 albums
Columbia Records albums